Novopetrovskoye is a village (selo) in Zianchurinsky District of the Republic of Bashkortostan, Russia, located north of the Russian border with Kazakhstan and near Orsk.

References

Rural localities in Zianchurinsky District